The Northern Boulevard station is a local station on the IND Queens Boulevard Line of the New York City Subway. Located at the intersection of Northern Boulevard and Broadway, it is served by the M train on weekdays, the R train at all times except nights, and the E and F trains at night.

History 

The Queens Boulevard Line was one of the first lines built by the city-owned Independent Subway System (IND), and stretches between the IND Eighth Avenue Line in Manhattan and 179th Street and Hillside Avenue in Jamaica, Queens. The Queens Boulevard Line was in part financed by a Public Works Administration (PWA) loan and grant of $25 million. One of the proposed stations would have been located at Northern Boulevard.

Under the 2015–2019 MTA Capital Plan, the station, along with 30 other New York City Subway stations, will undergo a complete overhaul and would be entirely closed for up to 6 months. Updates would include cellular service, Wi-Fi, charging stations, improved signage, and improved station lighting. However, these renovations are being deferred until the 2020–2024 Capital Program due to a lack of funding. In December 2019, the MTA announced that this station would become ADA-accessible as part of the agency's 2020–2024 Capital Program.
 In 2019, as part of an initiative to increase the accessibility of the New York City Subway system, the MTA announced that it would install elevators at the Northern Boulevard station as part of the MTA's 2020–2024 Capital Program. In December 2022, the MTA announced that it would award a $146 million contract for the installation of eight elevators across four stations, including Northern Boulevard.

Station layout 

The station has two tracks and two side platforms. The express tracks are below the station and not visible from the platforms. West of the station, the express tracks turn south under Northern Boulevard.

Both platform walls have a Puce trim line with a black border, with a number of replacement tiles in different shades of violet and purple having been placed during repairs. There are also mosaic name tablets reading "NORTHERN BLVD." in white sans-serif lettering on a black background and Puce border. Small tile captions reading "N BLVD" in white lettering on black run below the trim line, and directional signs in the same style are present below some of the name tablets. Dark teal I-beam columns run along both platforms at regular intervals, alternating ones having the standard black station name plate with white lettering.

There are heavy columns across one part of the station, where the New York Connecting Railroad to the Hell Gate Bridge crosses over. There is an older style wooden token booth in the mezzanine of the uptown entrance.

In the western half of this station, the express tracks go underneath the local tracks to run along Northern Boulevard. A short distance east of here, the express tracks rise to the same level as the local tracks. To the south (geographical west) of this station, there was a single crossover connecting the two tracks. In May 2019, this crossover was removed as part of the communications-based train control installation on the IND Queens Boulevard Line, which entailed the removal of under-used interlocking towers such as the Northern Boulevard crossover.

There is an emergency exit at the western end of the northbound platform at this station, which leads to the D3 and D4 express tracks below.

Exits
The station's exits are at the western end at Northern Boulevard and Broadway. Fare controls are at platform level and there are no crossovers or crossunders. The booth on the southbound side is full-time. Each fare control area has one street stair. There are closed exits at the eastern end on both sides. The IND "56th Street" direction tile and arrow are left intact on both platforms under the "Northern Blvd" tablet.

References

External links 

 
 Station Reporter — R Train
 Station Reporter — M Train
 The Subway Nut — Northern Boulevard Pictures
 Northern Boulevard entrance from Google Maps Street View
 Platforms from Google Maps Street View

IND Queens Boulevard Line stations
1933 establishments in New York City
New York City Subway stations in Queens, New York
Railway stations in the United States opened in 1933
Woodside, Queens